Trevor Smith (born February 8, 1985) is a Canadian former professional ice hockey centre. He most recently played with the San Antonio Rampage in the American Hockey League (AHL).

Early life
Smith is Jewish, and was born in Ottawa, Ontario. He is the son of Harvey Smith. His parents are originally from Montreal, Quebec. Smith grew up in Vancouver, British Columbia.  His father has coached Canada's ice hockey team in the Maccabiah Games.

Playing career

Amateur
Before college, he played in 2001–02 for the Queens Park Pirates Pacific Junior Hockey League (PIJHL), in 2003–04 for the Quesnel Millionaires of the British Columbia Hockey League (BCHL), and in 2004–05 for the Omaha Lancers of the United States Hockey League (USHL), for whom he played in the USHL All Star Game.

He played two seasons in the NCAA with the University of New Hampshire, in 2005–07.  There, he was an All Hockey East First team selection, an NCAA East Second Team All-American, and was named to the New England All-Star team.  He had 63 points in 78 games over two seasons.

Professional

He then signed as a free agent with the New York Islanders on April 2, 2007. He played 8 games with the Islanders' American Hockey League affiliate, the Bridgeport Sound Tigers at the end of the 2006–07 campaign, notching three points and two penalty minutes.

During the 2007–08 season, Trevor split time between the Utah Grizzlies and the Bridgeport Sound Tigers, playing 53 games in Bridgeport and 22 in Utah. He was picked to represent Utah at the ECHL All-Star game, but could not play as he was recalled to Bridgeport. He was named the Rbk Edge/AHL Rookie of the Month for February 2008 after scoring 15 points in 13 games.

Smith had a breakout year during the 2008–09 season for the Sound Tigers playing on the first line between Kurtis McLean and Mike Iggulden, scoring 30 goals and notching 32 assists in 76 games. Trevor made his NHL debut with the Islanders later that season, wearing number 77 and scoring one goal in seven games.

On July 2, 2010, Smith signed as a free agent to a one-year contract with the Anaheim Ducks.

On January 4, 2011, he was traded to the Columbus Blue Jackets in exchange for Nate Guenin. On July 5, 2011, Smith was signed to a one-year, two-way contract with the Tampa Bay Lightning.

In 2011–12, he played in the AHL All-Star Game, had an AHL Best Plus/Minus (+34), played for the AHL Calder Cup Champion, and had the AHL Most Points Playoffs (16).

On July 1, 2012, Smith was signed to a one-year, two-way contract with the Pittsburgh Penguins. Due to the NHL lockout, Smith was directly assigned to the Penguins AHL affiliate, the Wilkes-Barre/Scranton Penguins for the majority of the 2012–13 season. He was briefly recalled by the Penguins and played a solitary game against the New York Islanders on March 22, 2013.

During the summer of 2013 he was recruited to play for Team Canada in the 2013 Maccabiah Games in Israel, but was recovering from an upper-body injury sustained during the AHL playoffs and turned down the request; his father was assistant coach to the team, and it won a gold medal.  He said: "I would have been upset if Canada had lost because I had not gone".

On July 5, 2013, Smith was signed as a free agent to a one-year, one-way contract with the Toronto Maple Leafs for a reported $550,000. On September 30, he was assigned to the Toronto Marlies of the American Hockey League.

On October 4, 2013, Smith was named as team captain of the Toronto Marlies – the Maple Leafs' AHL affiliate, becoming the 5th Captain in team history.  On October 8 he debuted for the Leafs, becoming the 900th player in franchise history.

On July 2, 2015, Smith as a free agent signed his first contract abroad, agreeing to a two-year contract with Swiss club, SC Bern of the National League A (NLA). He won the 2016 Swiss championship with Bern, but missed large parts of the 2015-16 season after undergoing elbow surgery. He returned to game action in February 2016. During his Bern stint, Smith made 18 NLA appearances producing three goals and two assists and played in four contests of the Champions Hockey League, scoring one goal and two assists. He left after a single season at SCB.

On July 2, 2016, he inked a two-year, two-way contract with the Nashville Predators of the National Hockey League (NHL). Smith made his debut with the Predators in a solitary game during the 2016–17 season, spending the duration of his contract with Nashville's AHL affiliate, the Milwaukee Admirals.

As a free agent from the Predators, Smith agreed to a one-year AHL contract to add a veteran presence to the San Antonio Rampage on July 30, 2018.

Career statistics

Awards and honours

See also
List of select Jewish ice hockey players

References

External links

 

1985 births
Living people
AHCA Division I men's ice hockey All-Americans
Bridgeport Sound Tigers players
Canadian expatriate ice hockey players in Switzerland
Canadian ice hockey centres
Ice hockey people from Ottawa
Jewish Canadian sportspeople
Jewish ice hockey players
Milwaukee Admirals players
Nashville Predators players
New Hampshire Wildcats men's ice hockey players
New York Islanders players
Norfolk Admirals players
Omaha Lancers players
Pittsburgh Penguins players
Quesnel Millionaires players
San Antonio Rampage players
SC Bern players
Springfield Falcons players
Syracuse Crunch players
Tampa Bay Lightning players
Toronto Maple Leafs players
Toronto Marlies players
Undrafted National Hockey League players
Utah Grizzlies (ECHL) players
Wilkes-Barre/Scranton Penguins players